Yelleu is a town in the far west of Ivory Coast. It is a sub-prefecture of Zouan-Hounien Department in Tonkpi Region, Montagnes District.

Yelleu was a commune until March 2012, when it became one of 1126 communes nationwide that were abolished.

In 2014, the population of the sub-prefecture of Yelleu was 11,203.

Villages
The ten villages of the sub-prefecture of Yelleu and their population in 2014 are:

Notes

Sub-prefectures of Tonkpi
Former communes of Ivory Coast